Ana Filipa Santos (born 12 February 1996) is a Portuguese tennis player.

Santos has a career-high doubles ranking by the WTA of 625, achieved on 24 October 2022.

Santos made her Fed Cup debut for Portugal in 2019.

Alongside Jacqueline Cabaj Awad from Sweden, Santos won her first international title in doubles in Cancún, Mexico. They won the final against Astrid Cirotte and Anatasia Sysoeva.

Outside from tennis, Santos has a master's degree in Micro and Nanotechnologies Engineering from Faculdade de Ciências e Tecnologia, part of NOVA University Lisbon. She has defended her master's thesis (available here) with a final grade of 18 out of 20 marks.

ITF Circuit finals

Doubles: 3 (1 title, 2 runner–up)

References

External links
 
 
 

1996 births
Living people
Portuguese female tennis players
21st-century Portuguese women